Siraj Srity Songsod is a Bangladeshi Women's association football club from Rajshahi. They participate in Bangladesh Women's Football League, the women's premier football league in Bangladesh.

History
The Siraj Srity Songsod was founded on 28 March 1999. Bangladesh Football Federation (BFF) gave the club permission to participate in the league. The club will compete in the  2021–22 Bangladesh Women's Football League which starts in November 2022.

Season 2021–22
The club has played their debut game against Jamalpur Kacharipara Akadas on 17 November 2022 at Dhaka which won by 4–0.

Current squad

Competitive record

Head coach records

Club management

Current technical staff
As of October 2022

References

2022 establishments in Bangladesh
Dhaka
Association football clubs established in 2022
Women's football clubs in Bangladesh